"This Is God" is a song written and recorded by American country music artist Phil Vassar. It was released in January 2003 as the second single to the album, American Child. It peaked at number 17 on the U.S. Billboard Hot Country Songs chart, and number 9 on the U.S. Billboard Bubbling Under Hot 100 chart.

Background and writing
Vassar penned this song on a December 2002 plane ride and it was quickly released to country radio. It was made available on subsequent pressings of the album, American Child.

Content
The lyrics reflect the perspective of God and His disgust towards the fact that the world and the people that He created are displaying an unacceptable amount of hatred to one another, resulting in rather violent occasions such as wars, protests, terrorism and the like. It is subsequently a call for accountability and a reminder that there are consequences to actions, with God pleading in conclusion for all of His creations to permanently unite in peace and love.

Critical reception
Deborah Evans Price, of Billboard magazine reviewed the song favorably, calling it a "powerful, emotional song that takes a look at mankind's actions from a divine perspective." She goes on to say that it's not preachy, "just poignant, thought-provoking, and heartfelt, and Vassar's passionate delivery beautifully drives the message home."

Music video
The music video was directed by Deaton-Flanigen Productions and premiered in early 2003.

Chart positions
"This Is God" debuted at number 53 on the U.S. Billboard Hot Country Singles & Tracks for the week of January 11, 2003.

References

2003 singles
2002 songs
Phil Vassar songs
Songs written by Phil Vassar
Song recordings produced by Dann Huff
Arista Nashville singles
Music videos directed by Deaton-Flanigen Productions